"Don't Disturb This Groove" is a song by the synthpop/R&B duo The System, from the 1987 album of the same name. The song was written by The System's David Frank and Mic Murphy. It was released as the album's first single.

In May 1987, the song reached number 1 on the US Billboard R&B Singles chart, spending one week on top. It was later a hit on the Billboard Hot 100 during the summer of 1987 as well, peaking at number 4 in July.

Background

Instrumentalist David Frank said,

Track listing
7" Vinyl (US)
 "Don't Disturb This Groove" (Edit of Remix) (3:45)
 "Modern Girl" (4:40)

12" Vinyl (US)
 "Don't Disturb This Groove" (Vocal/Remix) (5:32)
 "Don't Disturb This Groove" (Dub Version) (4:25)
 "Don't Disturb This Groove" (Groove Remix) (5:20)

Chart performance

Other versions
Tupac sampled the song for his "Lost Souls", a song on the 1997 Gang Related film soundtrack.
An interpolation of the song is used in Victoria Beckham's hit single "This Groove", which reached the UK Top 3 in 2004.
The Backstreet Boys covered the song for their 2005 album, Never Gone.  It remains unreleased.
R&B group Silk recorded a cover of the song for its 2006 album, Always and Forever.
Bronx hip-hop group Cru sampled the song for the track "Pay Attention" for their 1997 debut album Da Dirty 30.
New York house DJ Chris Malinchak sampled and remixed the song for his 2013 single "So Into You".
DC gogo band UCB used the song composition as inspiration for their hit "Sexy Lady".
 Me'Shell Ndegéocello did a slow version of the song for her 2018 album Ventriloquism.
 Vaporwave artist 식료품groceries used a slowed down sample of the chorus for the track "Checkout (Have a Nice Day)" on the 2014 album 슈퍼마켓Yes! We're Open.

References

External links
[ "Don't Disturb This Groove" review at Allmusic.com]

1987 singles
The System (band) songs
Songs written by David Frank (musician)
1987 songs
Atlantic Records singles
Songs written by Mic Murphy
Contemporary R&B ballads
1980s ballads
Synth-pop ballads